CONEXPO-CON/AGG is North America’s largest construction trade show representing asphalt, aggregates, concrete, earthmoving, lifting, mining, utilities and more. CONEXPO-CON/AGG is a result of the merger of CONEXPO and CON/AGG in 1996. It is held at the Las Vegas Convention Center with the next show being held March 14-18, 2023. The International Exposition for Power Transmission (IFPE) is held in conjunction with CONEXPO-CON/AGG.

History 
In 1909, the first CONEXPO was held in Columbus, Ohio, and the first CON/AGG was held in Detroit Michigan in 1928. In 1996 the two shows merged, creating CONEXPO-CON/AGG. The first joint show was held in 1996 in Las Vegas, Nevada. CONEXPO-CON/AGG has gone on to become the western hemisphere's largest show for the construction and construction materials industries.

Show Highlights

1948 
American Road Builders Association sponsors the Road Show, predecessor of today’s CONEXPO-CON/AGG. The first Road Show after World War II is held at Soldier Field, Chicago, and is larger and more diverse than any previously held.

1999 
The 1999 show broke every record for U.S. trade shows with 1.7 million net square feet of exhibits and 124,000 attendees.

2002 
The International Fluid Power Exhibition (IFPE) is co-located with CONEXPO-CON/AGG for the first time. The show was previously held in Chicago beginning in 1984 by NFPA.

2005 
CONEXPO-CON/AGG 2005 became the largest show ever, in terms of attendance and exhibit space. The 2005 show had more than 124,300 industry professionals attend from around the world, with more than 1.8 million square feet of exhibit space.

2017 
The 2017 show spanned a record 2.8 million-plus net square feet of exhibits, with a record 2,800-plus exhibitors. Show attendance neared 128,000 for the week. The world’s first 3D-printed excavator and the new Tech Experience debuted at the 2017 show.

2020 
The 2020 show ended one day earlier than normal due to growing concerns over COVID-19. Registrations for the show were reported as over 130,000, though no official attendance numbers were published. The 2020 show had a large number of exhibitors at over 2000. A primary focus for the 2020 show was on women in construction and new technologies. The “Tech Experience” and education sessions reached their highest attendance since launching in the previous show with 150 sessions that included speakers from companies like Built Robotics, Trimble, and NASCAR driver Tyler Reddick.

Featured Products and Services 
The main topics of the show are:

 Aggregates
 Asphalt Production & Paving
 Admixtures
 Blasting
 Concrete
 Cement
 Compaction
 Drilling
 Engines & Components
 Earthmoving
 Heavy-duty and Off-road Trucks
 Hydraulics
 Information Technology
 Lifting Equipment
 Lubricants
 Pumps

Show Sponsors 
CONEXPO-CON/AGG is sponsored by:
Association of Equipment Manufacturers
National Ready Mixed Concrete Association
National Stone, Sand & Gravel Association
Associated General Contractors of America

References

External links 
CONEXPO-CON/AGG Official Website

See also 
Association of Equipment Manufacturers

Las Vegas Valley conventions and trade shows
Trade shows in the United States